The City of Cabuyao in the province of Laguna, Philippines is subdivided into eighteen (18) urbanized barangays. Six of them are located along the National Highway, six on the lakeshore of Laguna de Bay, the country's largest lake, three Poblacion Barangays which was created under the Presidential Decree No. 86 and three on the western part and elevation portion of the city.

The largest barangay in terms of land area is Barangay Gulod, it is popular for being the birthplace and hometown of Charice Pempengco, the country's teen singing sensation. In terms of population, Barangay Mamatid is the most populous barangay of the city, it is the site of Clarmil Manufacturing, Inc., the number one manufacturer of Goldilocks products in whole Southern Luzon.



Barangays

Barangay location
Cabuyao is composed of eighteen (18) urbanized barangays, in which six of them are located along the National Highway, six on the lakeshore of Laguna de Bay, the country's largest lake, three Poblacion Barangays which was created under the Presidential Decree No. 86 and three on the western part and elevation portion of the town.

Former Barangays

See also
 Barangay
 Cabuyao, Laguna
 Mamatid, Cabuyao

References

External links
Official Website of the City of Cabuyao
Cabuyao Website at MSC
Philippine Standard Geographic Code
2000 Philippine Census Information

 01
Cabuyao